Golden Threads Football Club is an Indian professional football club based in Kochi, Kerala, that plays in Kerala Premier League, the top division football league in the state of Kerala. They have also played in the I-League Second Division.

History
Golden Threads Football Club were formed on 10 April 2010, in Ernakulam, to compete in the Kerala Premier League. After achieving success in the regional league, they got the chance to play in the national level competition, ONGC I-League Division 2.

They have won the Cochin Premier League multiple times. They won the 2021–22 Kerala Premier League after defeating KSEB in the final and qualified for the I-League 2nd Division.

Players

Personnel

Current staff

Statistics and records

Honours

League
 Kerala Premier League
Champion (1): 2021–22

References

Football clubs in Kerala
Football clubs in Kochi
Association football clubs established in 2010
2010 establishments in Kerala
I-League 2nd Division clubs